Sri Lanka is a tropical island situated close to the southern tip of India. The invertebrate fauna is as large as it is common to other regions of the world. There are about 2 million species of arthropods found in the world, and still it is counting. So many new species are discover up to this time also. So it is very complicated and difficult to summarize the exact number of species found within a certain region.

This a list of the hymenopterans found from Sri Lanka.

Hymenoptera
Phylum: Arthropoda   Class: Insecta
Order: Hymenoptera

Hymenoptera is a large order containing an estimated 1,500,000 species of ants, bees, wasps, and sawfly. Females of hymenopterans possess a special ovipositor, which is used for inserting eggs into hosts or other surfaces safely. In some groups, this ovipositor is modified into a stinger, which is used primarily for defense purposes. Hymenopterans show a complete metamorphosis, where they have a worm-like larval stage and an inactive pupal stage before they mature. All hymenopterans are typically divided into two suborders. Those who have a narrow waist are categorized into suborder Apocrita, whereas those who absent a waist into suborder Symphyta. Wasps, bees, and ants are belong to Apocrita. Sawflies, horntails, and parasitic wood wasps are belong to Symphyta.

Bees are the primary pollinators of terrestrial flowering plants. The hairs within its body helps to function as efficient pollinators. The highest bee diversity is confined to warm temperate regions of the world. Bee attacks are sometimes found from some areas, but it is not fatal as that of a wasp. There are about 70,000 bee species described in the world with nearly 450 genera and 7 families. Out of them, Sri Lanka comprises 149 species included to 38 genera and 4 families. The bee researches are extensively carried out by Dr. Inoka Karunaratne et al. from University of Sri Lanka.

Ants are social insects that can be found in terrestrial ecosystems. They are also very common in human settlements, as well as in forest floor. Well over 6000 species of ants were found and described, and new species are about to discover. Sri Lanka is home to 229 species of ants that included to 66 genera and 12 subfamilies. There are 102 endemic species in Sri Lanka, with 48.6% of endemism. One endemic genus Aneuretus is also included to the list. The following list is according to the Ants of Sri Lanka by Prof. R.K. Sriyani Dias 2014 comprehensive edition by Biodiversity Secretariat on Ministry of Environmental and Renewable Energy of Sri Lanka.

Wasps are morphologically resemble bees, but are different group of hymenopterans. They are eusocial insects, with a prominent stinger. Few wasps are solitary in behavior and they are mostly parasitoids. They are important agriculturally, hence used a biological predator to eradicate pests and other agriculturally harmful insects. Wasp attacks are more frequent in Sri Lanka, where they are known to attack humans when provoked. They are numerous around many archeological sites and attacks sometimes can be fatal to death. In 1897, Bingham compiles the hymenopteran diversity within the island through the volume The Fauna of British India including Ceylon and Burma, Hymenoptera Vol. 1, Wasps and Bees. In 2001, K.V. Krombein and B.B Norden published notes on trap nesting Sri Lankan wasps and bees.

Family: Agaonidae - Fig wasps
Eupristina masoni
Karadibia gestroi
Platyscapa frontalis
Sycoscapter stabilis
Watshamiella infida

Family: Ampulicidae - Cockroach wasps
Ampulex ceylonica
Ampulex compressa
Dolichurus albifacies
Dolichurus aridulus
Dolichurus lankensis
Dolichurus silvicola
Trirogma regalis

Clade: Anthophila - Bees

Family: Aphelinidae - Aphelinid wasps
Ablerus connectens
Aphelinus lankaensis
Coccophagus flavescens
Coccophagus longifasciatus
Coccophagus srilankensis
Coccophagus zebratus
Encarsia aonidiae
Encarsia bimaculata
Encarsia planchoniae
Encarsia Sophia
Marietta leopardina
Proaphelinoides elongatiformis
Promuscidea unfasciativentris

Family: Aulacidae - Aulacids
Pristaulacus krombeini
Pristaulacus signatus

Family: Braconidae - Braconids
Aleiodes euproctis
Apanteles paludicolae
Apanteles pratapae
Apanteles tiracolae
Aphrastobracon flavipennis
Aspilota ceylonica
Bracon albolineatus
Bracon greeni
Gammabracon erythroura
Homolobus truncatoides
Schoenlandella nigromaculata

Family: Chalcididae - Chalcids
Antrocephalus ceylonicus
Antrocephalus dividens
Antrocephalus mitys
Brachymeria nephantidis
Dirhinus altispina
Dirhinus claviger
Dirhinus pilifer
Dirhinus sinon
Epitranus nigriceps
Epitranus observatory
Hockeria lankana
Hockeria tristis
Neochalcis cinca
Rhynchochalcis brevicornuta
Tropimeris monodon

Family: Chrysididae - Cuckoo wasps
Chrysis ionophris
Loboscelidia ora
Stilbum cyanurum

Family: Crabronidae - Crabronid wasps
Cerceris erythrosoma
Cerceris hortivaga
Crossocerus nitidicorpus
Psenulus carinifrons
Tachytes modestus

Family: Dryinidae - Dryinid wasps
Anteon lankanum
Anteon sulawesianum
Gonatopus lini

Family: Encyrtidae - Encyrtids

Adelencyrtus chionaspidis
Anagyrus greeni
Anicetus ceylonensis
Anthemus chionaspidis
Aschitus lichtensiae
Astymachus japonicas
Callipteroma testacea
Cheiloneuromyia planchoniae
Cheiloneurus hadrodorys
Copidosoma agrotis
Encyrtus adustipennis
Encyrtus corvinus
Exoristobia philippinensis
Homalopoda cristata
Metaphycus lichtensiae
Parablastothrix nepticulae
Psyllaephagus yaseeni
Tachardiaephagus tachardiae

Family: Eucharitidae - Eucharitid wasps
Chalcura deprivata
Cherianella narayani
Eucharis cassius
Neolosbanus laeviceps
Schizaspidia convergens
Schizaspidia nasua

Family: Eulophidae - Eulophids

Ceranisus nigricornis
Ceranisus semitestaceus
Chrysocharis lankensis 
Cirrospilus ambiguus
Cirrospilus coccivorus
Closterocerus insignis 
Closterocerus pulcherrimus
Elasmus anamalaianus
Elasmus ashmeadi 
Elasmus binocellatus
Elasmus brevicornis 
Elasmus indicus 
Elasmus khandalus
Elasmus kollimalaianus
Elasmus nagombiensis
Elasmus narendrani
Elasmus punensis
Eulophus tardescens
Euplectromorpha formosus
Euplectromorpha jamburaliyaensis
Euplectromorpha laminum
Euplectrus atrafacies
Euplectrus ceylonensis
Euplectrus colliosilvus
Euplectrus geethae
Euplectrus leucostomus
Euplectrus litoralis
Euplectrus mellocoxus
Euplectrus nibilis
Euplectrus peechansis
Euplectrus xanthovultus 
Metaplectrus solitarius
Metaplectrus teresgaster
Metaplectrus thoseae 
Oomyzus ovulorum
Platyplectrus coracinus
Platyplectrus flavus
Platyplectrus gannoruwaensis 
Platyplectrus melinus
Platyplectrus truncatus 
Sarasvatia srilankensis
Sympiesis striatipes
Tamarixia leucaenae
Tetrastichus howardi
Tetrastichus lankicus
Tetrastichus niger
Tetrastichus patannas
Trichospilus diatraeae
Trichospilus pupivorus

Family: Eupelmidae - Eupelmids
Balcha reticulifrons
Calosota aestivalis 
Eupelmus javae 
Eupelmus tachardiae
Metapelma albisquamulata
Metapelma taprobanae

Family: Eurytomidae - Seed chalcids
Eurytoma attiva 
Eurytoma contraria 
Prodecatoma josephi

Family: Figitidae - Figitids
Prosaspicera validispina

Family: Formicidae - Ants

Family: Ichneumonidae - Ichneumonids
Casinaria lenticulata
Chriodes orientalis
Dusona flinti
Enicospilus abessyniensis
Enicospilus albiger
Enicospilus krombeini
Enicospilus laqueatus
Temelucha pestifer 
Venturia lankana
Venturia triangulata

Family: Leucospidae - Leucospids
Leucospis lankana
Leucospis viridissima

Family: Mymaridae - Fairyflies
Acmopolynema narendrani 
Anagrus elegans
Camptoptera enocki
Camptoptera protuberculata
Camptoptera serenellae
Camptoptera tuberculata 
Ptilomymar besucheti
Stephanodes similis

Family: Orussidae - Parasitic wood wasps
Mocsarya metallica

Family: Perilampidae - Perilampids
Krombeinius eumenidarum
Krombeinius srilanka
Monacon angustum 
Monacon senex

Family: Platygastridae - Platygastrids

Embidobia orientalis
Habroteleia flavipes
Heptascelio striatosternus
Opisthacantha infortunata
Oxyscelio ceylonensis
Oxyscelio cuculli 
Scelio apo 
Scelio consobrinus
Scelio variicornis
Tanaodytes soror 
Telenomus adenyus 
Telenomus molorchus 
Telenomus sechellensis
Trissolcus aloysiisabaudiae
Trissolcus mitsukurii 
Trissolcus sulmo

Family: Pompilidae - Spider wasps

Agenioideus smithi
Auplopus cyanellus 
Auplopus funerator 
Auplopus imitabilis
Auplopus krombeini 
Auplopus laeviculus
Auplopus lankaensis
Cyphononyx confusus
Episyron arrogans 
Episyron novarae 
Episyron praestigiosum
Episyron tenebricum
Evania appendigaster
Hemipepsis caeruleopennis
Hemipepsis fulvipennis
Irenangelus punctipleuris
Java atropos 
Pompilus cinereus 
Pompilus mirandus
Pseudagenia aegina 
Pygmachus krombeini

Family: Pteromalidae - Pteromalids
Coelopisthia lankana
Dinarmus vagabundus
Dipara intermedia
Grahamisia gastra
Halticoptera propinqua
Herbertia indica 
Mnoonema timida
Neolyubana noyesi
Papuopsia striata
Philotrypesis quadrisetosa
Sphegigaster brunneicornis
Walkarella temeraria

Family: Rhopalosomatidae - Rhopalosomatid wasps
Paniscomima abnormis
Paniscomima darlingi
Paniscomima lottacontinua

Family: Scoliidae - Scoliid wasps
Liacos erythrosoma

Family: Sphecidae - Thread-waisted wasps
Chalybion bengalense
Chalybion fuscum
Chalybion gracile 
Sceliphron coromandelicum
Sceliphron spinolae
Sphex fumicatus 
Sphex sericeus 
Sphex subtruncatus - ssp krombeini

Family: Torymidae - Torymids
Odopoia atra 
Palmon greeni 
Podagrion charybdis
Podagrion epibulum 
Podagrion judas 
Podagrion micans 
Podagrion scylla
Torymoides amabilis

Family: Trichogrammatidae - Trichogrammatids
Mirufens ceylonensis

Family: Vespidae - Social wasps

Antepipona bipustulata 
Antepipona frontalis 
Antepipona ovalis 
Cyrtolabulus suavis 
Ischnogaster eximius  
Mitrodynerus vitripennis 
Polistes stigma - ssp. infraspecies, tamula
Rhynchium brunneum 
Ropalidia marginata 
Symmorphus alkimus 
Vespa affinis - ssp. indosinensis 
Vespa mandarinia 
Vespa tropica - ssp. haematodes

Notes

References

Sri Lanka
 
hymenopterans